Robert Valentine may refer to:

 Bob Valentine (referee) (born 1939), football referee
 Bob Valentine (footballer), rugby league and football (soccer) player
 Bob Valentine (baseball), baseball player
 Bobby Valentine (born 1950), baseball player and manager
 Rob Valentine (born 1950), mayor
 Rob Valentine (rugby) (born 1941), rugby union and rugby league footballer
 Robert Valentine (composer) (c. 1671 – 1747), Anglo-Italian composer
 Bob Valentine (speedway rider) (born 1940), Australian speedway rider

See also
 Bobby Valentino (British musician) (born 1954), singer, violinist, actor